Dalane Tidende is a local newspaper published in Egersund, Norway.

Dalane Tidende was started in 1885 as Dalernes Tidende. Its name was changed in 1934. It was stopped in 1941, but returned in 1945.

It has a circulation of 7,385 (2019).

Dalane Tidende is published by Dalane Tidende & Egersund Avis AS, which is owned by half a dozen private persons.

References
Norwegian Media Registry

External links
Website

Publications established in 1885
Daily newspapers published in Norway
Egersund
1885 establishments in Norway